The Dhano Dhanye Express is an Express train belonging to Eastern Railway zone that runs between  and  in India. It is currently being operated with 13117/13118 train numbers on four days in a week basis.

Service

The 13117/Dhano Dhanye Express has an average speed of 47 km/hr and covers 223 km in 4h 50m. The 13118/Dhano Dhanye Express has an average speed of 47 km/hr and covers 223 km in 4h 50m.

Coach composition

The train has standard ICF coach with max speed of 110 kmph. The train consists of 11 coaches:

 1 AC III Tier
 2 Chair Car
 6 General
 2 Generators cum Luggage/parcel van

Stops
Kolkata railway station, Naihati railway station, Ranaghat railway station, Krishnanagar City Junction railway station, Bethuadahari railway station, Palashi railway station, Beldanga railway station, Berhampore Court railway station, Murshidabad railway station, Jiaganj railway station, Lalgola railway station.

Timings
 13117 Dhanodhanya express leaves Kolkata Railway station at 4:10pm afternoon on Tuesdays, Thursdays, Fridays and Sundays, and reaches Lalgola same day at 8:55pm same day. It reaches Jiaganj at 8:01pm, Murshidabad station at 7:53pm, Berhampore Court Station at 7:40pm, Beldanga at 7:19pm, Plassey at 7:00pm, Bethuadahari at 6:41pm, Krishnanagar at 6:18pm, Ranaghat at 5:45pm, Naihati at 4:56pm.
 13118 Dhanodhanya express departs Lalgola at 7:00am in morning on Mondays, Wednesdays, Fridays and Saturdays via Jiaganj (7:20am), Murshidabad (at 7:28am), Behampore Court (at 7:45am), Beldanga (at 8:01am), Plassey (8:16am), Bethuadahari (at 8:37am), Krishnanagar (9:20am), Ranaghat (10:00am), Naihati (10:40am) and reaches Kolkata railway station at 11:35am the same day.

Notes 

Seating arrangement is available in lieu of sleeping arrangement.

References

External links 
 13117/Dhano Dhanye Express
 13118/Dhano Dhanye Express

Transport in Kolkata
2010 establishments in India
Named passenger trains of India
Rail transport in West Bengal
Railway services introduced in 2010
Express trains in India